Bartolommeo Fumo (died 1545) was an Italian Dominican theologian.

Life

Fumo was born at Villo ("Villaurensis"), near Piacenza in Italy.   At an early age he entered the Dominican Order and made great progress in all the ecclesiastical sciences, but especially in canon law. He was distinguished as an inquisitor at Piacenza.

Works

He is best known for his work, "Summa casuum conscientiae, aurea armilla dicta". This work, which was dedicated to Catalano Trivulzio, Bishop of Piacenza, went through many editions, including those of Antwerp (1591) and Lyons (1594). It contained, in brief and compendious form, a digest of all similar explanations since the thirteenth century. He gives a clear case against probabilism.

He is also the author of "Expositio compendiosa in epistolas in Pauli et canonicas", and book entitled, "Poemata qaedam". His first work, "Philothea, opus immortalis animi dignitatem continens", was dedicated to Catalano before he became bishop.

References

Attribution

1545 deaths
Italian Dominicans
16th-century Italian Roman Catholic theologians
Year of birth unknown